The term Judiciary Act may refer to any of several statutes relating to the organization of national court systems:

 Australia
 Judiciary Act 1903
 United States
 Judiciary Act of 1789, established the federal judiciary.
 Judiciary Act of 1801, also called the Midnight Judges Act.
 Judiciary Act of 1802, repealed the 1801 Act.
 Judiciary Act of 1866, which may refer to two different laws.
 Judicial Circuits Act:  (July 23, 1866), gradually reduced circuit and Supreme Court seats.
 Act of July 27, 1866: , removed certain cases from state courts to the federal courts.
 Judiciary Act of 1867, also called the Habeas Corpus Act of 1867, amended sec. 25 of the Act of 1789 regarding Supreme Court review of state court rulings
 Judiciary Act of 1869, also called the Circuit Judges Act of 1869
 Judiciary Act of 1891, also called the Evarts Act or the Circuit Courts of Appeals Act.
 Judiciary Act of 1925, also called the Certiorari Act or the Judges' Bill.